Nazzareno Di Marco (born 30 April 1985) is an Italian discus thrower.

His personal bests, 64.93 m set in 2019, at the end of the 2020 outdoor season is the 6th best all-time performance of the Italian lists and in that year it was also the 29th best result in the world top-lists.

National titles
Di Marco won a national championship at individual senior level.

Italian Winter Throwing Championships
Discus throw: 2021

See also
 Italian all-time top lists - Discus throw

References

External links
 

1985 births
Living people
Italian male discus throwers
Athletics competitors of Fiamme Oro